Sir James Frederick Emery (1886–1983) was a British Conservative Party politician.  He was elected at the 1935 general election as the Member of Parliament (MP) for Salford West, and was defeated by the Labour candidate at the 1945 election.

References

Conservative Party (UK) MPs for English constituencies
Members of the Parliament of the United Kingdom for Salford West
1886 births
1983 deaths
Place of birth missing
Place of death missing
People from Salford
UK MPs 1935–1945